Robert Arthur "Tut" Taylor Sr. (November 20, 1923 – April 9, 2015) was an American bluegrass musician.

Taylor played banjo and mandolin as a child, and began playing dobro at age 14, learning to use the instrument with a distinctive flat-picking style. Taylor was a member of The Folkswingers in the 1960s, who released three albums; he recorded his debut solo effort in 1964. Later in the 1960s, he played with the Dixie Gentlemen and in John Hartford's Aereo-Plain band.

Taylor became a local Nashville, Tennessee fixture. In 1970, he co-founded the instrument shop GTR there, soon after releasing another solo album. He also co-founded the Old Time Pickin' Parlor, a Nashville venue noted for performances of old-time music, as well as Tut Taylor's General Store.

In a March, 1992 interview, Neil Young reported having bought Hank Williams' Martin D-28 Guitar from Tut Taylor.

At the Grammy Awards of 1995, he was awarded the Grammy Award for Best Bluegrass Album for his work on The Great Dobro Sessions with Jerry Douglas.

Taylor recorded hundreds of reels of tape documenting and preserving bluegrass music, from "kitchen recordings" to live concerts, as well as serving as a recording engineer for studio albums.  He donated about 500 reels to the Steam Powered Preservation Society, which has digitized many of them and made them available for streaming or downloading.

Taylor died on April 9, 2015.

Discography
 12-String Dobro World Pacific 1816, 1963
 Dobro Country (with Clarence & Roland White), World Pacific, 1964
 Blues & Bluegrass With Dixie Gentlemen, Tune 1001, 1966
 Aereo-Plain, Warner Bros, 1971, Reissued by Rounder, 1997
 Friar Tut, Rounder 0011, 1972
 No Name Album, Flying Fish HDS704, 1974
 The HDS Sessions, HDS 701, 1975
 The Old Post Office, Flying Fish 008, 1975
 Norman Blake/Tut Taylor/Sam Bush/Butch Robins/Vassar Clements/David Holland/Jethro Burns (1976)
 Dobrolic Plectral Society, Takoma C1050, 1976
 The Great Dobro Sessions, Sugar Hill, 1994
 Flat Pickin' The Kitchen, Tutlee TL1001, 1997
 Flash Flood, Tutlee TL1002, 1998
 Steam Powered Aereo-Takes, Rounder, ROUN0480, 2002
 Tut and Clarence Flatpicking, Tutlee TL1003, 2003
 Shacktown Road (2007) (with Norman Blake and Nancy Blake)
 Oozing the Blues - Barker and Taylor, 2008 (with Steve Barker and Lorrie Barker)

References

External links
Tut Taylor official web site. Accessed February 2009.
Tut Taylor Interview NAMM Oral History Library (2013)

1923 births
2015 deaths
People from Milledgeville, Georgia
Musicians from Nashville, Tennessee
Guitarists from Georgia (U.S. state)
American bluegrass musicians
Resonator guitarists
American bluegrass mandolinists
Guitarists from Tennessee
20th-century American guitarists
Country musicians from Tennessee
Country musicians from Georgia (U.S. state)